Red Sands is a twenty-four-minute cinematic documentary about bullfighting and Spanish tradition. The film is directed by David Procter and produced by Andrea Farrena alongside British Production Company Agenda Collective.

Red Sands was nominated for a British Independent Film Award in 2008.

References

External links
 Agenda Collective Official Website
 

2008 documentary films
2008 films
2000s Spanish-language films
British sports documentary films
2000s British films